The 1948–49 Klass B season was the second season of the Klass B, the second level of ice hockey in the Soviet Union. 12 teams participated in the league, and Lokomotiv Moscow won the championship. Lokomotiv, Dynamo Sverdlovsk, and SKIF Leningrad were promoted to the Soviet Championship League.

First round

Central Zone

Eastern Zone

Final tournament

External links
 Season on hockeyarchives.info

2
Soviet Union
Ice hockey leagues in the Soviet Union